The 2016–17 Jacksonville State Gamecocks men's basketball team represented Jacksonville State University during the 2016–17 NCAA Division I men's basketball season. The Gamecocks, led by first-year head coach Ray Harper, played their home games at the Pete Mathews Coliseum in Jacksonville, Alabama as members of the East Division of the Ohio Valley Conference. They finished the season 20–15, 9–7 in OVC play to finish in third place in the East Division. As the No. 4 seed in the OVC tournament, they defeated Southeast Missouri State, top-seeded Belmont, and UT Martin to win the tournament title. As a result, they received the conference's automatic bid to the NCAA tournament, its first ever appearance, where it lost in the first round to Louisville.

Previous season 
The Gamecocks finished the 2015–16 season 8–23, 4–12 in OVC play to finish in last place in the East Division. As a result, they failed to qualify for the OVC tournament.

Following the season, Jacksonville State and head coach James Green mutually agreed to part ways. On April 6, 2016, the school hired Ray Harper as head coach.

Preseason 
In a vote of Ohio Valley Conference head men’s basketball coaches and sports information directors, Jacksonville State was picked to finish last in the East Division of the OVC.

Roster

Schedule and results

|-
!colspan=9 style=| Exhibition

|-
!colspan=9 style=| Regular season

|-
!colspan=9 style=| Ohio Valley Conference tournament

|-
!colspan=9 style=|NCAA tournament

References

Jacksonville State Gamecocks men's basketball seasons
Jacksonville State
Jacksonville State